KK Cedevita history and statistics in FIBA Europe and Euroleague Basketball (company) competitions.

Record
KK Cedevita has overall, from 2007–08 (first participation) to 2018–19 (last participation): 59 wins against 89 defeats in 148 games for all the European club competitions.

1st-tier: EuroLeague: 13–31 (44)
2nd-tier: EuroCup: 44–51 (95)
3rd-tier: FIBA EuroChallenge: 4–6 (10)

External links
 KK Cedevita at FIBA
 KK Cedevita at EuroCup Basketball

KK Cedevita